Jim Tomes (born July 31, 1948) is a Republican member of the Indiana Senate, representing the Senate District 49 since 2010. As one of the founders of the 2nd Amendment Patriots gun rights grassroots organization, he has served as its director since its inception in January 1999. This group is dedicated to protecting the Second Amendment, guaranteed in the Bill of Rights. 
He has received support from the Tea Party and is a proponent for conservative causes including smaller government, right to life and the 2nd amendment. For 33 years, he was a trucker and served as a union steward.

Tomes broke ranks with Republican leadership in the State Senate and the administration of Republican Governor Mitch Daniels to oppose the "right-to-work" legislation that became law in Indiana in 2012. His legislative history shows that he is sympathetic to the anti-vaccine movement. He voted against legislation for collegiate meningitis vaccine requirements. Tomes also introduced a bill in 2018 that would require schools to inform parents about vaccine exemptions which are allowed by law. He voted against a bill in 2019 that would require assisted living facilities to inform residents about the seasonal influenza vaccine.

References

External links
Jim Tomes at Ballotpedia
Virtual Office of Senator Jim Tomes official Indiana State Legislature site
Campaign website

1948 births
Republican Party Indiana state senators
Living people
21st-century American politicians